Soria is a municipality and a Spanish city, located on the Douro river in the east of the autonomous community of Castile and León and capital of the province of Soria. Its population is 38,881 (INE, 2017), 43.7% of the provincial population. The municipality has a surface area of 271,77 km2, with a density of 144.97 inhabitants/km2. Situated at about 1065 metres above sea level, Soria is the second highest provincial capital in Spain.

Although there are remains of settlements from the Iron Age and Celtiberian times, Soria itself enters history with its repopulation between 1109 and 1114, by the Aragonese king Alfonso I the Battler. A strategic enclave due to the struggles for territory between the kingdoms of Castile, Navarre and Aragon, Soria became part of Castile definitively in 1134, during the reign of Alfonso VII. Alfonso VIII was born in Soria, and Alfonso X had his court established when he received the offer to the throne of the Holy Roman Empire. In Soria, the deposed king James IV of Mallorca died, and John I of Castile married. Booming during the Late Middle Ages thanks to its border location and its control over the cattle industry, Soria went into a slow decline over the next few centuries. It was  damaged greatly during the Peninsular War.

The city preserves an important architectural heritage (extensive medieval walls, Renaissance palaces and architecturally distinctive Romanesque churches) and is home to the Numantine Museum (with pieces from the nearby Celtiberian city of Numantia). Soria's football team CD Numancia is named after this city. It is one of the smallest cities to ever have had a team in Spain's top division La Liga.

Today, its population of 38,881 makes Soria the least populated provincial capital of Castile and León and the second least populated in Spain (after Teruel). Particularly important in its economy is the agri-food industry, while an increasing number of tourists are attracted by its cultural heritage. Soria was mentioned by UNESCO as a good example when including the Mediterranean diet in its Representative List of the Intangible Cultural Heritage of Humanity.

Name 

It is claimed that in Roman times there was a castle called Oria, purportedly named after a Greek knight called Doricus. Based on this folk etymology, some historians guessed that the first inhabitants of this city might have been the Dorians. Archaeology has not confirmed that story. Instead it has suggested that the first inhabitants were the Suebi, whose kings (as reported by Tutor and Malo in their Compedio historial de las dos Numancias) established one of their courts there. These two hypotheses have been abandoned because of lack of evidence. It seems more likely that the name Soria may have its origin in the word dauria from the river Durius (Douro).

Shield 

The shield of Soria has the following heraldic description:

The king in the coat of arms is Alfonso VIII, born in Soria, and the red field represents the blood shed by the Sorians, particularly in the battles of Alarcos, Navas de Tolosa and Aljubarrota.

The oldest preserved example of the coat of arms is found in the high-medieval bell of San Gil, today the Church of Nuestra Señora de la Mayor, which already reflected the city's motto. Unlike the current official coat of arms, the king who now appears on the bust of the castle's keep on the castle's bell tower, is represented in the bell of San Gil with his entire body at the foot of the castle, leaving through its door.

History 

The area of Soria was inhabited by the Iberians, who merged with the Celts to form the Celtiberians around the 4th century BC.

After the fall of the Western Roman Empire, the rebuilt city was occupied by the Suebi. Later, after the Arab conquest of Spain, it grew in importance due to its proximity to the border of the Christian lands, which in the 8th century had settled along the Duero river.

In 869 Soria was the centre of the rebellion of Suleyman ibn-Abus against the emir of Córdoba, who sent his son Hakan to quench it.

Alfonso I of Aragon and Navarre, the Battler seized the territory away from the sphere of the Kingdom of León, controlling the territory from 1109 to 1134, entrusting the role of first tenant of Soria to Íñigo López already by 1119, when the effective repopulation should have started, although there are claims tracing it back some time earlier. Soria was granted a short fuero in March 1120, that also fixed limits to the medieval concejo. After the death of Alfonso I in 1134, Alfonso VII of León, the Emperor took control of the territory. The short fuero was confirmed by Alfonso VII in 1143.

Due to its strategic placement at the borders of the Kingdoms of Castile, Aragon, Navarre and León, Soria in the Middle Ages was at the centre of several conflicts between them. Alfonso VIII of Castile, in reward for its support, gave the city several privileges which it maintained until modern times. In 1195 the town was stormed by Sancho VII of Navarre, but later recovered and continued to develop its splendour and trades.

Soria lost most of its importance after the unification of Aragón and Castile in 1479, and above all after the decree of exile issued against the Jews in 1492. In the War of Spanish Succession (early 18th century), Soria sided for Philip V. In 1808 it was captured and set on fire by the French troops.

The economical and social crisis of Spain in the early 20th century, and the Spanish Civil War with Francisco Franco's dictatorship which followed, had negative effects on Soria and its neighborhood, which became depopulated due to strong emigration.

The policy of the current authorities aims to strengthen the local economy pivoting on Soria's tourism potential, and has also launched a programme of reconstruction for the neighbouring villages.

Culture 

The poet Antonio Machado (1875-1939) spent five years in Soria teaching French in a secondary school, before moving to the neighbouring town of Segovia. These years proved significant in his literary development. He married and lost his wife there and discovered much about the nature of the Castilian people – a subject the Generation of '98 authors were very interested in. Campos de Soria was a series of poems lamenting his wife's early death. They formed part of a major collection Campos de Castilla.

The firewalking rituals performed at the Sorian village of San Pedro Manrique every June as part of the festival of San Juan have been declared as a tradition of National Tourist Interest and have attracted global attention through ethnographic and scientific studies and media coverage.

Religion 

Although Soria never was a bishopric, its St. Peter's church became the Co-Cathedral of the bishopric of Osma when that was renamed Roman Catholic Diocese of Osma-Soria on 1959.03.09. The province of Soria has a Minor Basilica, the Marian Basílica de Nuestra Señora de los Milagros, in Ágreda.

Main sights 

 Ecclesiastical 
 Plateresque Concatedral de San Pedro, erected in the 12th-13th centuries, rebuilt in the 16th century, and its cloister.
 San Juan de Rabanera, Romanesque church from the 12th century
 San Polo, a former monastery of the Knights Templar. The churches of San Nicolás and San Ginés are from the same age.
 the Romanesque convent church of Santo Domingo (12th century)
 Nuestra Señora de la Mayor (16th century), with a Romanesque portal
 Iglesia del Espino (16th century)
 San Juan de Duero with its 12th century ruined cloisters located on the other side of the river from the old town.
 The sanctuaries of Ermita de San Saturio (18th century) and Ermita de la Soledad (17th century).
 The Ermita de Nuestra Señora del Mirón (Hermitage of Our Lady of Miron), with a baroque/rococo interior, founded - according to legend - by Theodemar in the sixth century. Since September 2009 the building has been used by a Romanian Orthodox parish.

 Other

 The Renaissance Ayuntamiento (Town Hall, 16th century), in the Plaza Mayor (main square)
 Palacio de la Audiencia (theatre), from 1739
 Palacio de los condes de Gomara  (Judiciary Palace, 1592)
 remains of the medieval castle, commanding the town from the eponymous hill, and of the walls
 The Church of San Nicolás de Soria (Spanish: Iglesia de San Nicolás) is a ruined remnant of a Romanesque-style church. It was declared Bien de Interés Cultural in 1962.

A few kilometres north of the town are the ruins of Numantia, a Celtiberian town whose inhabitants destroyed it rather than let it fall to Scipio. In Soria is the Museo Numantino, devoted to the archaeological remains of this and other sites in the province.

Transportation 

The city is served by the Soria Railway Station, with daily services to Madrid via Guadalajara. There are also many bus lines to neighbouring cities. A new highway has reduced the trip to Madrid by car down to 2 hours.

Geography 

Soria sits on the banks of Douro river, in its upper course. Its municipality is formed by the city, and four rural hamlets: Las Casas, Oteruelos, Pedrajas and Toledillo; both Oteruelos and Pedrajas were small municipalities later absorbed by Soria by the 1970s. The shape of the municipality is highly irregular and it is not even continuous, as it comprises three disjointed areas.

Climate 

Soria has an oceanic climate (Köppen: Cfb). Due to its altitude, winters in Soria are very cold by Spanish standards ( in January) with almost 84 frost days per year. Temperatures above  are not rare in summer, while lows can go under  at nights. It has scant rainfall (512 mm per year) and spring is the wettest season. The low rainfall is in spite of its high elevation as the maritime Atlantic low-pressure systems are often blocked by the mountains closer to the coast. It is the coldest Spanish provincial capital.

Sport 

The city's professional football club is called CD Numancia.

Two of Spain's foremost runners of the late 20th century lived and trained in Soria: Fermín Cacho, a gold medallist at the 1992 Barcelona Olympics, and Abel Antón, a two-time World Champion in the marathon. The area in which they trained, Monte Valonsadero, is now host to the annual Cross Internacional de Soria meeting – one of Spain's most prestigious cross country running competitions.

The European Youth Orienteering Championships were held in Soria in July 2010.

Economy

Municipal services 

Soria has a biomass district heating plant called Red de Calor de Soria, which uses woodchip residue fuel from the local timber industry. Venture capital firm AXIS, part of Instituto de Crédito Oficial (ICO), the Spanish promotional bank, has made an equity investment in the project. The project plans to provide 80 GWh of renewable energy per year, which will heat 8,000 homes, saving 28,000 tons of carbon dioxide emissions.

Twin towns 

 1994 — Collioure (France)

Notable people 

 Saint Saturius of Soria

 Javier Modrego

See also  

 List of municipalities in Soria
 List of Spanish cities
 Numantia

References 

Citations

Bibliography

Sources and external links 

 A scientific study of a fire-walking ritual from Discovery Channel's The Daily Planet Show
 GCatholic

 
Municipalities in the Province of Soria